Terence Mike Parkin (born 12 April 1980 in Bulawayo, Zimbabwe) is a swimmer from South Africa, who won the silver medal at the 2000 Summer Olympics in the 200m Breaststroke. Parkin, who is deaf, also competed in the 2004 Summer Olympics, as well as the Deaflympics in which he took home 29 gold medals.

Parkin is the only deaf swimmer to be part of the FINA's elite rankings in 1999 and 2000. He holds the record for winning the most number of medals in Deaflympics history with a total of 33.
In 2011, Parkin saved a young boy from drowning.

2000 Sydney Olympic Games
Parkin competed in his first Olympic games in 2000 at the age of 20.  He used sign language to communicate with his coach.  About his trip to the Olympics, Parkin said "I am going to the Olympics to represent South Africa, but it's so vitally important for me to go, to show that the deaf can do anything.  They can't hear, they can see everything. I would like to show the world that there's opportunities for the deaf."

Terence Time

Holds the Deaf World Record</big> 
50m Swimming Pool
 200m breaststroke (2:12.50)
 200m Individual Medley (2:03.33)
 400m Individual Medley (4:16.92)
25m Swimming Pool
 400m Freestyle (3:55.68)
 800m Freestyle (8:07.36) 
 100m Backstroke (58.31)
 200m Backstroke (2:02.83)
 200m Breaststroke (2:08.91)
 200m Medley (1:58.64)
 400m Medley (4:10.39)
didn't not put on New World Record 
100m Freestyle (50.77) 21 Nov 2009
1500m Freestyle (15:22.28) 17 Oct 2009
200m Backstroke (2:00.60) 6 Dec 2003
200m Breaststroke (2:07.91) 19 Mar 2000
50m Butterfly (25.14) 21 Nov 2009
200m Medley (1:57.87) 2 Feb 2000

Holds the Deaflympice Record 
50m Swimming Pool
 100m breaststroke (1:03.51) 2009
 200m breaststroke (2:16.32) 2009

Terence Parkin Best Time for Short Course (25 m) https://www.fina.org/athletes/1013888/terence-parkin

Olympics & Deaflympics Results

See also Deaf people in the Olympics
 List of Commonwealth Games medallists in swimming (men)
 List of Olympic medalists in swimming (men)

References

1980 births
Living people
Sportspeople from Bulawayo
Zimbabwean emigrants to South Africa
Male breaststroke swimmers
South African male swimmers
Swimmers at the 2000 Summer Olympics
Swimmers at the 2004 Summer Olympics
Olympic swimmers of South Africa
Olympic silver medalists for South Africa
Medalists at the 2000 Summer Olympics
Deaf swimmers
South African people of British descent
Zimbabwean people of British descent
Medalists at the FINA World Swimming Championships (25 m)
Swimmers at the 2002 Commonwealth Games
Commonwealth Games silver medallists for South Africa
Olympic silver medalists in swimming
Commonwealth Games medallists in swimming
African Games gold medalists for South Africa
African Games medalists in swimming
South African deaf people
Goodwill Games medalists in swimming
African Games silver medalists for South Africa
African Games bronze medalists for South Africa
Competitors at the 1999 All-Africa Games
Competitors at the 2001 Goodwill Games
Medallists at the 2002 Commonwealth Games